Best Beech Hill is a locality in the civil parish of Wadhurst in the Wealden district of East Sussex, England.

Villages in East Sussex
Wadhurst